Sandro Rossi (born 16 April 1946) is a Swiss diver. He competed in the men's 10 metre platform event at the 1972 Summer Olympics.

References

1946 births
Living people
Swiss male divers
Olympic divers of Switzerland
Divers at the 1972 Summer Olympics
Place of birth missing (living people)
20th-century Swiss people